The Human Factor is a 2019 American-Israeli documentary film directed by Dror Moreh. The film follows a thirty-year effort to secure peace in the Middle-East.

The film had its world premiere at the Telluride Film Festival on August 30, 2019. It was released in the United States on January 22, 2021, by Sony Pictures Classics.

Premise 
The epic behind-the-scenes story of the United States' 30-year effort to secure peace in the Middle East. Recounted from the unique perspective of the American mediators on the frontlines.

Release 
The film had its world premiere at the Telluride Film Festival on August 30, 2019. It also screened at the Hamptons International Film Festival on October 12, 2019, AFI Fest on November 17, 2019, and DOC NYC in November 2019. In January 2020, Sony Pictures Classics acquired distribution rights to the film. It was released in the United States on January 22, 2021.

Reception

Critical response 
The site's critical consensus reads, "A rare opportunity to look back at history being made, The Human Factor offers an engrossing behind-the-scenes look at efforts to end generations of bloodshed." Joe Morgenstern of The Wall Street Journal reviewed the film positively, stating "It's a deeply wise examination of statesmanship and leadership, or their egregious absence; a celebration of compromise as the indispensable element of diplomacy; and a stirring argument for the power of humanity." The Hollywood Reporter's Todd McCarthy called the film "A riveting look at a missed opportunity."

Accolades

References

External links 
 
 

2019 films
2019 documentary films
American documentary films
Israeli documentary films
Sony Pictures Classics films
2010s English-language films
2010s American films